Zygmunt Gosiewski (born 11 November 1959) is a Polish boxer. He competed in the men's light middleweight event at the 1980 Summer Olympics.

References

1959 births
Living people
Polish male boxers
Olympic boxers of Poland
Boxers at the 1980 Summer Olympics
Sportspeople from Olsztyn
Light-middleweight boxers
20th-century Polish people
21st-century Polish people